Boguchany is a rural locality (a selo) and the administrative center of the Boguchansky District of Krasnoyarsk Krai, Russia, located on the left bank of the Angara River. Population:

Transportation
Boguchany is served by the Boguchany Airport.

Climate
Boguchany has a subarctic climate (Köppen climate classification Dfc) with severely cold winters and warm summers. Precipitation is quite low, but is somewhat higher from June to September than at other times of the year.

References

Rural localities in Krasnoyarsk Krai
Boguchansky District